Dennis Bounds is a former weeknight news anchor for KING-TV, a television station in Seattle, Washington. Dennis started with KING-TV in March 1991 and accepted a retirement buy-out by Tegna, formerly Gannett, in April 2016. He will no longer be seen on KING-TV, after 25 years with the station He lives in Redmond, Washington.

Bounds graduated from the University of North Dakota in 1974. He received a BA in sociology. He is married, and his three children attend public schools in the Seattle area.

News Anchor career
On December 14, 1994, Bounds was promoted from the morning/noon newscasts to the weeknights evening news, a role he has held since then. In April 2016, Bounds took a voluntary retirement offer, along with long-time co-anchor Jean Enersen, former chief meteorologist Jeff Renner, and reporter Linda Byron.

References

People from Redmond, Washington
University of North Dakota alumni
Living people
Television anchors from Seattle
Year of birth missing (living people)